The 1993–94 New Jersey Nets season was the Nets' 27th season in the National Basketball Association, and 18th season in East Rutherford, New Jersey. During the off-season, the Nets signed free agents Kevin Edwards, Armen Gilliam, and undrafted rookie guard David Wesley, and acquired Benoit Benjamin from the Los Angeles Lakers. After the tragic death of star guard Dražen Petrović, who died in a car accident during the off-season on June 7, 1993; Derrick Coleman and Kenny Anderson would both step it up, having All-Star seasons being selected for the 1994 NBA All-Star Game. The Nets got off to a rough start losing 10 of their first 14 games, as Chris Morris only played just 50 games due to knee and thumb injuries. In December, the team traded Rumeal Robinson to the Charlotte Hornets in exchange for Johnny Newman. However, after holding a 22–24 at the All-Star break, the Nets would win 8 of their final 11 games finishing third in the Atlantic Division with a 45–37 record.

Coleman averaged 20.2 points, 11.3 rebounds and 1.8 blocks per game, and was named to the All-NBA Third Team, while Anderson averaged 18.8 points, 9.6 assists and 1.9 steals per game. In addition, Edwards provided the team with 14.0 points and 1.5 steals per game, while Gilliam contributed 11.8 points and 6.1 rebounds per game off the bench, and Morris provided with 10.9 points per game.

However, in the Eastern Conference First Round of the playoffs, the Nets would lose in four games to the New York Knicks. The Knicks would reach the NBA Finals, but would lose in seven games to the Houston Rockets. 

Following the season, a frustrated Chuck Daly stepped down as head coach, while Newman signed as a free agent with the Milwaukee Bucks, and Wesley signed with the Boston Celtics.

Draft picks

Roster

Regular season

Season standings

z – clinched division title
y – clinched division title
x – clinched playoff spot

Record vs. opponents

Game log

Regular season

Playoffs

|- align="center" bgcolor="#ffcccc"
| 1
| April 29
| @ New York
| L 80–91
| Derrick Coleman (27)
| Derrick Coleman (10)
| Kenny Anderson (6)
| Madison Square Garden19,763
| 0–1
|- align="center" bgcolor="#ffcccc"
| 2
| May 1
| @ New York
| L 81–90
| Kenny Anderson (21)
| Derrick Coleman (21)
| four players tied (3)
| Madison Square Garden19,763
| 0–2
|- align="center" bgcolor="#ccffcc"
| 3
| May 4
| New York
| W 93–92 (OT)
| Derrick Coleman (25)
| Derrick Coleman (17)
| Kenny Anderson (11)
| Brendan Byrne Arena20,049
| 1–2
|- align="center" bgcolor="#ffcccc"
| 4
| May 6
| New York
| L 102–92
| Derrick Coleman (31)
| Derrick Coleman (9)
| Kenny Anderson (7)
| Brendan Byrne Arena20,049
| 1–3

Player statistics

Season

Playoffs

Player Statistics Citation:

Awards and records
 Derrick Coleman, All-NBA Third Team

Transactions

References

See also
 1993–94 NBA season

New Jersey Nets season
New Jersey Nets seasons
New Jersey Nets
New Jersey Nets
20th century in East Rutherford, New Jersey
Meadowlands Sports Complex